The Road Ahead is the bi-monthly magazine of the Royal Automobile Club of Queensland (RACQ) in Australia.

History 
The magazine was first published in 1940. It replaced the Queensland Motorist which was the monthly journal of the RACQ published since 1926.

Circulation data 
The Road Ahead, is Queensland’s highest circulating magazine, with 836,995 printed copies and 410,584 digital copies distributed each edition.

References 

Bi-monthly magazines published in Australia
1940 establishments in Australia
Magazines established in 1940